The Niels P. Hjort House is a historic house in Fairview, Utah. It was built with limestone in 1878 by Niels P. Hjort, an immigrant from Norway who converted to the Church of Jesus Christ of Latter-day Saints and settled in Fairview in 1870. His house was designed in the Greek Revival style. It has been listed on the National Register of Historic Places since October 3, 1980.

References

		
National Register of Historic Places in Sanpete County, Utah
Greek Revival architecture in Utah
Houses completed in 1878
1878 establishments in Utah Territory